Sorbus hemsleyi is a species of whitebeam native to central China. The fruit are a major component of the diet of the yellow-throated marten (Martes flavigula).

The cultivar 'John Bond' has gained the Royal Horticultural Society's Award of Garden Merit as an ornamental.

References

hemsleyi
Trees of China
Endemic flora of China
Plants described in 1915